Katherine Dorothea Duncan-Jones,  (13 May 1941 – 16 October 2022) was an English literature and Shakespeare scholar. She was a Fellow of New Hall, Cambridge (1965–1966) and then Somerville College, Oxford (1966–2001). She was also Professor of English Literature at the University of Oxford from 1998 to 2001. She was a scholar of Shakespeare and his contemporaries.

Personal life
Duncan-Jones was born on 13 May 1941 to the philosopher Austin Duncan-Jones and the literary scholar Elsie Duncan-Jones (née Phare). Her brother is the historian Richard Duncan-Jones. She was educated at King Edward VI High School for Girls, Birmingham, an all-girls private school. She studied at St Hilda's College, Oxford, graduating with a Bachelor of Arts (BA) degree and a Bachelor of Letters (BLitt) degree: as per tradition, her BA was later promoted to a Master of Arts (MA Oxon) degree.

Duncan-Jones married the writer A. N. Wilson in 1971. Together they had two daughters: Emily, a classicist, and Bee Wilson, a food writer. They divorced in 1990.

Duncan-Jones died from complications of dementia on 16 October 2022, at the age of 81.

Academic career
Duncan-Jones was Mary Ewart Residential Fellow at Somerville College, Oxford, from 1963 to 1965. She was then a Fellow of New Hall, Cambridge, from 1965 to 1966. She then returned to Somerville College and was Fellow and Tutor in English Literature between 1966 and her retirement in 2001. She was also Professor of English Literature at the University of Oxford from 1998 to 2001. She was a senior research fellow of Somerville College from 2001 until her death.

In 1991, Duncan-Jones was elected a Fellow of the Royal Society of Literature (FRSL). She was a  prolific writer and essayist, whose articles often appeared in Renaissance Quarterly.  She was a beloved teacher and supported younger scholars, especially women, in academia https://www.theguardian.com/culture/2022/nov/24/katherine-duncan-jones-obituary. For many years, she regularly reviewed productions of early modern drama for the "Times Literary Supplement" . Her specialty was early modern literature, and she had particular interests in clowns, transvestism, visual art and Italian and Classical influences on Renaissance British literature. Her early work focused on the work of Sir Philip Sidney, the subject of her B. Litt. thesis, of whom she wrote a definitive biography and a collected edition. She wrote a pair of biographies of Shakespeare, notable for their willingness to challenge received wisdom, their careful situating of Shakespeare within the context of his time, and their lack of "bardolatry"; Duncan-Jones was always well aware that there can be a vast distance between a person and their artistic work. Her biographical writing on Shakespeare pointed to evidence she discovered, through careful study of archives, that the man, if not the poet, was a social climber obsessed with acquiring his coat of arms. Like her earlier work on Sidney, her biographies of Shakespeare unearthed the "man behind the myth" https://www.some.ox.ac.uk/news/professor-katherine-duncan-jones-1941-2022/.  William Shakespeare  Duncan-Jones is remembered for her deep love and knowledge of the work of Shakespeare and his contemporaries, her devotion to Renaissance literature and to the Bodleian Library, and her love of live theater, especially productions of Shakespeare and other Elizabethan and Jacobean dramatists.  She produced a definitive edition of Shakespeare's Poems for Arden (with Henry Wodehysen) and of Shakespeare's Sonnets (also for the Arden Shakespeare).

Selected works
 Sir Philip Sidney: Courtier Poet. Yale University Press 1991 
 Sir Philip Sidney: The Major Works, editor. Oxford University Press 2009 
 Shakespeare's Poems, ed. Katherine Duncan-Jones and H. R. Woudhuysen, London 2007. 
 Shakespeare. An ungentle Life. London 2010. 
 Shakespeare. Upstart Crow to Sweet Swan 1592–1623. London 2011. 
 Shakespeare's Sonnets, editor. Arden 2010.

References

External links 
 Katherine Duncan-Jones Oxford University

1941 births
2022 deaths
Shakespearean scholars
Fellows of the Royal Society of Literature
English women writers
People educated at King Edward VI High School for Girls, Birmingham
Fellows of Somerville College, Oxford
Fellows of New Hall, Cambridge
Alumni of St Hilda's College, Oxford